Glyphidocera audax is a moth in the family Autostichidae. It was described by Walsingham in 1892. It is found in the West Indies.

The wingspan is about 16 mm. The forewings are dull fawn-brown, densely irrorated with fuscous scales throughout and with an elongate transverse fuscous spot before the middle, of which the lower extremity touches the fold. There is a smaller fuscous spot at the end of the cell and a few fuscous scales about the apical margin indicate the extremities of the veins. The hindwings are cinereous, with a slight fawn-brown shade from the base above their middle, as well as a narrow inconspicuous subfuscous band across the extreme apex.

References

Moths described in 1892
Glyphidocerinae